Hauganes is a village located in Eyjafjörður in northern Iceland. Hauganes has about 137 inhabitants.

The place name Hauganes means "mound peninsula". Fishing is an important industry to the village. Salted fish is produced there, the factory also runs a seafood restaurant in the summer months and operates pay-what-you-want hot tubs at the coast.

Whales and seals may be viewed at a number of spots, from Hauganes it is possible to visit the offshore islands of Hrísey and Grímsey.

References

External links
Ektafiskur ehf.
Whale Watching Hauganes
 North Iceland Attractions

Populated places in Northeastern Region (Iceland)
North Iceland